The Church of the Larger Fellowship (CLF) provides a ministry to isolated Unitarian Universalists (UUs). Its mission also includes growing Unitarian Universalism by supporting small congregations and new UUs around the world. The CLF also offers resources to Unitarian Universalists active in local congregations.

The CLF provides an outreach ministry, which includes the Church of the Younger Fellowship (a ministry for young adults), the CLF's Military Ministry and a Prison Ministry. The CLF also provides email list communities, discussions, and web-based education materials. CLF members have access to a lending library of books, CDs, videotapes, and sermons; lifespan religious education curricula and self-study guides; and the monthly distribution of sermons and other worship material through its worship publication, Quest. The CLF also podcasts sermons and readings from Quest and offers online courses on its website.

History
CLF was founded in 1944 as a part of the American Unitarian Association's Extension Department. In 1947, Rev. Dr. Clinton Lee Scott helped organize the Universalist Church of the Larger Fellowship, which was merged with the Unitarian CLF in 1961. The CLF was incorporated in 1970 as an independent congregation, with the same polity as any other congregation in the UUA.

Church-on-Loan program
The CLF Church-on-Loan program provides worship and program materials to small, mostly lay-led UU congregations that enroll in the program.

Church of the Younger Fellowship
In 2005, the Church of the Younger Fellowship (CYF) was established and run by young adults to help connect Unitarian Universalists (ages 18-35).

Military Ministry
The CLF Military Ministry is the newest outreach program for the CLF.   Working with UU military chaplains and chaplain candidates, and with the support of the UU Funding Program's Fund for Unitarian Universalism, the CLF created a new website by and for UUs in the military.

Prisoner Ministry
The CLF Ministries to prisoner members provides a Unitarian Universalist church home for incarcerated UUs.

Letter-Writing Ministry
CLF's Letter-Writing Ministry matches CLF prisoner-members with non-incarcerated Unitarian Universalists to exchange letters.

References

External links
 clfuu.org & questformeaning.org Church of the Larger Fellowship websites.
 Church of the Younger Fellowship website
 Quest for Meaning website 
 Daily Compass website 

Unitarian Universalist organizations
Christian organizations established in 1944
Christian organizations established in 1970